Bombastic may refer to:

 Bombastic (EP), a 2015 EP by Bonnie McKee
 Bombastic (video game), a video game for PlayStation 2

See also 
 Boombastic (disambiguation)
 Verbosity